Scopula ichinosawana is a moth of the  family Geometridae. It is found in Japan and Russia.

The wingspan is 20–25 mm.

Subspecies
Scopula ichinosawana ichinosawana
Scopula ichinosawana honshuensis Inoue, 1982

References

Moths described in 1925
ichinosawana
Moths of Japan
Moths of Asia